Last Year Was Complicated is the third studio album by American singer Nick Jonas. It was released on June 10, 2016, by Island and Safehouse Records. The album features collaborations with Tove Lo, Ty Dolla $ign, and Big Sean. The album's lead single, "Close", was released on March 25, 2016.

Background

On August 5, 2015, Jonas debuted a new song, "Under You", at the iHeartRadio Music Summit. In February 2016, he covered the February/March 2016 edition of Complex magazine he mentioned the songs "Chainsaw" and "Don't Make Me Choose", and also revealed a surprising collaboration with Purity Ring’s Corin Roddick. That same month, it was revealed that singer Ty Dolla $ign had a feature on the record and that there was also a female singer on the record which name he didn't reveal. He also revealed that he worked again with Jason Evigan and Sir Nolan.

On March 24, 2016, Jonas announced the album's title, release date and tracklist through a series of tweets. Jonas revealed that work on the album took him a year and a half, tweeting: "Shit is too real sometimes... Reliving some of these real life experiences through this music is hard". During a radio interview with Carson Daly, Jonas noted that the album was supposed to be named Unhinged like the song on the record. However, after a conversation with rapper Jay-Z, Jonas changed the title to Last Year Was Complicated.

Promotion
Two songs of the record ("Don't Make Me Choose" and "Under You") were performed on several dates of his Nick Jonas: Live in Concert tour. Jonas is set to promote the record on the Future Now Tour alongside Demi Lovato. On the evening of March 24, 2016, Jonas previewed four tracks from Last Year Was Complicated during a listening party, held for the press and television bookers. Jonas performed the songs "Champagne Problems" and "Close" (with Tove Lo) live on Saturday Night Live on April 16, 2016. On April 24, 2016, Jonas performed the songs "Bacon", "Close" and "Voodoo" during his set at the New Orleans Jazz Fest. He announced also that there will be a music video of "Voodoo".

During the taping of CMT Crossroads he performed the songs "Chainsaw" with Thomas Rhett and "Close" with Thomas Rhett and Danielle Bradbery. He and Tove Lo are set to perform the song live on May 22, 2016 at the 2016 Billboard Music Awards. On April 28, Both of them performed the song on Jimmy Kimmel Live!. He performed a solo version of the song on The Ellen DeGeneres Show on May 9, 2016. Jonas is set to perform at the 2016 iHeartRadio Much Music Video Awards. On June 10 he performed the songs Jealous, Close, Champagne Problems and Bacon live on Today. He Performed Close, The Difference and When We Get Home at a target surprise show.

Singles
On March 24, 2016, "Close" was announced as the album's lead single. Released the following day, the song features guest vocalist, Swedish singer, Tove Lo.

"Bacon", featuring Ty Dolla $ign, was originally released as a promotional single on June 3, 2016. It was sent to US Rhythmic radio on July 12, 2016, as the album's second single, replacing "Chainsaw", which had originally been confirmed for the position.
A music video of the song was released on Tidal on June 6, 2016, with a 30-second teaser available to non-subscribers.

Promotional singles
"Champagne Problems" was released as the first promotional single on April 8, 2016. On November 7 he dropped the video of the song online. "Chainsaw" was released as the second promotional single on May 13, 2016 along with the video. Its music video was released on May 13, 2016, and was directed by Luke Monaghan. The song was originally planned to be released as the second single, but was replaced by "Bacon".

Other songs
"Under You" charted at 8 on the New Zealand heatseekers chart on June 20, 2016. The video of the song was released on June 10. It's served to be released on UK radio sometime.
On October 11 the video of the track "Voodoo" premiered exclusively on Tidal, with a 30-second teaser for non subscribers.

Critical reception

Last Year Was Complicated received positive reviews from music critics. Stephen Thomas Erlewine of AllMusic claimed that the album "feels assured in a way its eponymous 2014 predecessor did not," noting that "the entirety of 'Last Year Was Complicated' walks a fine line between immaculately produced pop confection and personal confession: it may not be heartbreaking but it feels as if it comes from the heart." In his review for Entertainment Weekly, Nolan Feeney declared that it "grows into the neon pop-R&B sound of 2014’s Nick Jonas while adopting a show-don’t-tell approach to maturity on [its] songs." Keith Harris wrote for Rolling Stone that Jonas is "personable and versatile" on the record, while praising his "supple falsetto" for "sounding wounded or seductive as required, allows him to stake out his own patch of territory on the border between pop and R&B." Sam C. Mac of Slant Magazine noted that despite the break-up themes, "'Last Year Was Complicated' offers an even more vibrant collection of colorful, propulsive beats than 'Nick Jonas' did." However, he observed that "as a singer, Jonas isn't always willing to evolve with his music." Harriet Gibsone of The Guardian highlighted that "There are many quirks to this glossy, compelling record, but [...] it’s not savvy or strange enough to stand out."

Commercial performance
The album debuted at number two on the Billboard 200, with first week sales of 66,000 units, being 47,000 actual album sales, that gave to him a position at number one that week on the Top Albums sales Chart, in the United States.

Track listing

Notes
 signifies a vocal producer.

Sample credits
"Comfortable" contains audio elements of Allen Iverson's press conference.

Personnel
Credits adapted from the standard edition of Last Year Was Complicated.

Performers and musicians

Nick Jonas – main vocals, guitars 
Tove Lo – featured artist 
Ty Dolla $ign – featured artist 
Big Sean – featured artist 
Deanna DellaCioppa – background vocals 
Demi Lovato - background vocals  
Sean Douglas – additional keys 
Jason Evigan – all instruments 
Rickard Göransson – bass 
Marcus Kincy – additional keys , piano , additional bass 
Savan Kotecha – background vocals 
Pierre Luc – guitars 
Mattman & Robin – bass , keyboards , drums and percussion , marimba , snaps and handclaps , synths , guitars 
Julia Michaels – background vocals 
Ali Payami – drums , keys , synths , bass 
Shellback – drums , guitars 
Dewain Whitmore, Jr. – background vocals 

Production

Cory Bice – assistant 
Peter Carlsson – vocal editing 
John Cranfield – recording 
Serge Curtois – mixing 
Jason Evigan – production 
Chris Gehringer – mastering
Serban Ghenea – mixing 
Jason Goldberg – mix assistant 
Louie Gomez – mix assistant 
John Hanes – engineered for mix 
Billy Hickey – engineering 
Sam Holland – engineering 
Maximilian Jaeger – recording 
Nick Jonas – production 
Rico Love – production , recording 
Max Martin – production 
Tony Maserati – mixing 
David Massey – executive production
Mattman & Robin – production , programming , recording 
Noah Passovoy – recording , engineering , recording 
Ali Payami – production , programming 
James Royo – engineering , mixing 
Tyler Scott – assistant mix engineer 
Shellback – production 
John Shullman – engineering , recording 
Sir Nolan – production , recording 
The Struts – recording 
Eric Weaver – engineering 

Design

Kyledidthis – art direction, design
Paul Lane – package production
Yu Tsai – photography

Charts

Weekly charts

Year-end charts

Release history

References

2016 albums
Nick Jonas albums
Island Records albums
Safehouse Records albums
Albums produced by Mattman & Robin
Albums produced by Max Martin
Albums produced by Shellback (record producer)
Albums produced by Jason Evigan